Jimmie Ross is an American rock guitarist and vocalist who is best known for being a member of Pittsburgh band the Jaggerz, known for their 1970 hit "The Rapper". During the band's initial existence of 1965-1976, the bassist shared the duties of lead vocalist with guitarist Donnie Iris. By the time the Jaggerz regrouped in 1989, Iris was well into his solo career, and Ross became the sole lead vocalist and remained bassist. He continues to hold both positions today.

Before the Jaggerz, Ross was a member of a band called Gary and the Jewel Tones. Members of this band merged with members of Donnie and the Donnelles to form The Jaggerz.

During the years of the Jaggerz' split, Ross was a member of The Skyliners and then Cooper & Ross.

In 2010, he released his first solo album, Full Circle, which contained covers of Jaggerz songs.

Discography

With The Jaggerz 
 Introducing the Jaggerz, 1969
 We Went to Different Schools Together, 1970
 Come Again, 1975
 And the Band Played On..., 1998
 Re-Rapped by Request, 2001

Cooper & Ross 
 Bottom Line, 1982

Solo 
 Full Circle, 2010

References 

Living people
American rock bass guitarists
The Jaggerz members
Musicians from Pittsburgh
Guitarists from Pennsylvania
American male bass guitarists
Year of birth missing (living people)